The People's Republic of China military reform of 2015 was a major restructuring of the People's Liberation Army (PLA), which flattened the command structure and allowed the Chinese Communist Party (CCP) to have more control over the military, with the aim of strengthening the combat capability of the PLA.

History 

Reform of China's defense and military structure began after Xi Jinping became the General Secretary of the Chinese Communist Party and the Chairman of the Central Military Commission in 2012. Under Xi's administration, China created the CCP National Security Commission and established an air defense identification zone in the East China Sea in 2013. In 2014, Xi told the CCP Politburo that the PLA should operate by integrating multiple services.

The "deepening national defense and military reform" was announced in November 2015 at a plenary session of the Central Military Commission (CMC)'s Central Leading Group for Military Reform. They were expected to be long and extensive that aimed at turning the PLA into a modern military on par with international standards. Before the reforms were announced, CCP general secretary Xi Jinping, who is also the commander-in-chief as CMC chairman, had said the commission should directly control the military and new regional commands be created.

In January 2014, Chinese senior military officers said that the People's Liberation Army (PLA) was planning to reduce the number of military regions from seven to five "Theater Commands" to have joint command with the ground, naval, air and rocket forces.  This is planned to change their concept of operations from primarily ground-oriented defense to mobile and coordinated movements of all services and to enhance offensive air and naval capabilities.  The coastal areas would be turned into three military regions, each with a joint operations command (Jinan, Nanjing and Guangzhou) for projecting power into the Yellow Sea, East China Sea and South China Sea.  The four other inland military regions (Shenyang, Beijing, Chengdu and Lanzhou) will be streamlined into two military areas mainly for organizing forces for operations.  The change was projected to occur through 2019.

The South China Morning Post reported in December 2015 that the Central Military Commission, chaired by CCP general secretary Xi Jinping, would scrap all four army headquarters — the General Political, General Logistics, General Armament and General Staff Departments, and replaced with the Political Work, Logistic Support,  Equipment Development and Joint Staff Departments respectively.

References 

Military reforms
People's Liberation Army
Military reform